Chernigovsky (masculine), Chernigovskaya (feminine), or Chernigovskoye (neuter) is the name of several rural localities in Russia:
Chernigovsky, Republic of Bashkortostan, a khutor in Tlyaumbetovsky Selsoviet of Kugarchinsky District of the Republic of Bashkortostan
Chernigovsky, Chelyabinsk Oblast, a settlement in Chernigovsky Selsoviet of Agapovsky District of Chelyabinsk Oblast
Chernigovsky, Kirov Oblast, a settlement under the administrative jurisdiction of the town of Kirs in Verkhnekamsky District of Kirov Oblast
Chernigovsky, Kagalnitsky District, Rostov Oblast, a khutor in Ivanovo-Shamshevskoye Rural Settlement of Kagalnitsky District of Rostov Oblast
Chernigovsky, Proletarsky District, Rostov Oblast, a khutor in Budennovskoye Rural Settlement of Proletarsky District of Rostov Oblast
Chernigovskoye, a selo in Prokhladnensky District of the Kabardino-Balkar Republic